A residential cluster development, or open space development, is the grouping of residential properties on a development site to use the extra land as open space, recreation or agriculture.  It is increasingly becoming popular in subdivision development because it allows the developer to spend much less on land and obtain much the same price per unit as for detached houses. The shared garden areas can be a source of conflict, however.  Claimed advantages include more green/public space, closer community, and an optimal storm water management. Cluster development often encounters planning objections. 

According to William H. Whyte, the author of “Cluster Development” there are two types of cluster development: townhouse development and super development. Examples of townhouse development include Morrell Park, Philadelphia, Pennsylvania, Hartshone in Richmond, and Dudley Square in Shreveport. Examples of super development include Reston, Virginia, Crofton, Maryland, and Americana Fairfax in Virginia.

Background
In many ways, cluster development has been practiced since the earliest communities from the medieval village to the New England town. However, it was formalized as a modern concept only by the onset of suburban sprawl and ubiquity of detached house developments. The idea of a cluster development was created as the alternative to the conventional subdivision.

The first conscious application of a cluster development was in Radburn, New Jersey, in 1928. It was based on English planning and Ebenezer Howard’s Garden City movement but used principles of cluster development. Following Radburn, many other towns in New Jersey applied those principles to their planning notably the village green in Hillsborough, New Jersey, and Brunswick Hill in South Brunswick.  In the rest of the country the use of cluster development grew in principally in Maryland and Virginia, notably in Reston and American Fairfax County.

Currently cluster development is applied all over the United States. There is particularly a strong push for it in the Midwestern States that have had significant problems with urban sprawl, such as Minnesota, Illinois, Ohio, and Wisconsin.

Cluster development, also known as conservation development, is a site planning approach that is an alternative to conventional subdivision development. It is a practice of low-impact development that groups residential properties in a proposed subdivision closer together in order to utilize the rest of the land for open space, recreation or agriculture. Cluster development differs from a planned unit development (PUD), which contains a mix of residential, commercial, industrial, or other uses, but the cluster development primarily focuses on residential areas.

Purpose
The purpose of cluster development is to:
promote integrated site design that is considerate to the natural features and topography
protect environmentally sensitive areas of the development site, as well as permanently preserve important natural features, prime agricultural land, and open space
minimize non-point source pollution through reducing the area of impervious surfaces on site
encourage saving costs on infrastructure and maintenance through practices such as decreasing the area that needs to be paved and the decreasing distance that utilities need to be run
the primary purpose is to create more area for open space, recreation and more social interaction

Benefits
Thanks to there being more porous ground coverings and fewer impervious surfaces such as asphalt and concrete, the risk of flooding and erosion from stormwater is reduced.  Economical benefits of cluster development can include there being less infrastructure to build— fewer roads, sewers, and utility lines.  The higher density of the clusters of housing also tends to mean more efficiency for services such as public transit, and can also promote increased bicycle usage and the encouragement of pedestrians.  The extra open space made available by this type of development leaves room for parks, trails, and community-supported agriculture.

Issues
Following World War II, migration from the cities to suburbs became a dominant trend in America. People were acquiring any land they could find; as a result developers attempted to squeeze as many lots as they could on development sites. Communities then developed zoning regulations to limit the number of units and density allowed on a site. Though this zoning protected land for communities and to an extent preserved land from development, it was what ultimately led to the suburban sprawl as we know it today. It is this zoning that cluster development attempts to amend, and is the primary issue it faces.

Most municipalities have established zoning which restricts developers, planning boards and communities to use only this conventional subdivision development. Thus, the practice of traditional development is difficult to change because of the set standard, familiarly of the procedure, and the fear of undertaking something new. In response to this, groups such as the American Planning Association have developed a model ordinance that provides the framework for cluster development. This ordinance is not difficult to implement administratively, but politically, it is problematic because of conservative resistance.

People's perception of personal space has a large part to do with this resistance. Many cases people chose to live in suburbs with the intention of having a large lot property; therefore, it is hard to convince those individuals to live closer together. Convincing people to accept small lot sizes and higher density living remains one of the biggest obstacles of cluster development. This obstacle can be mostly overcome with proper site design, which grants homes unobstructed views and effective private space. As well as educating people about the benefits of having better community and open space can serve as encouragement to change perceptions.

An additional obstacle to cluster development is the difficulty for creating small lot sizes when no municipal sewer system is in place. When septic systems are used, enough land needs to be available on each building lot for a leach field (sometimes land is required for two leach fields, the additional land set aside as a back-up). The amount of land needed is in proportion to the size of the septic system and the soil conditions, which must allow for the percolation of wastewater safely into the ground. In areas where well water is used, additional lot area may be required to sufficiently separate the well from the leach field.

However, installing a package wastewater treatment plant (WWTP) for the development (which acts as a small cluster plant, eliminating the need for individual septic tanks) or using biofilters with each septic system make smaller lot sizes acceptable. In addition, providing a package WWTP reduces the diameter and depth of collection sewer lines for the cluster, thus reducing the overall cost of infrastructure. 

The final primary issue with cluster development is the issue of dealing with open, recreational, and agricultural space. These areas serve as benefits in many respects but are also issues that are required to be dealt with. The maintenance of open and recreational space requires the formation of home owners associations that necessitate fees for taxes, insurance and general upkeep. This would not be necessary under a typical subdivision, but people would have their own maintenance expenses. As to agriculture: people enjoying living next to it until there is a need to apply fertilizer or pesticides. This fact cannot be avoided, but through proper use of cluster development, there can be wider gaps and barriers between agricultural land and residential properties, which would limit exposure to unwanted byproducts.

Application
The model ordinance for cluster development is section 4.7 in the Smart Growth Codes, issued by the American Planning Association. Along with introducing the concept of residential cluster development, the ordinance outlines the process of application, site planning and implementation. 

The primary requisites for application of cluster development are that all principal or accessory uses are allowed and that multifamily dwelling, duplexes, and townhouses are permitted. As well the application of maximal lot coverage, floor area ratios, building height, and parking requirements to the entire site as opposed to the individual lot. There also needs to be the ability to place more than one principal building on each lot, and lastly no less than 25% of the site is used for open space. 

Included in the application, the site plan is required to consist of the street and sidewalk layout, the maximum number and type of dwelling units proposed, and how much area they will occupy, with calculations; as well as the area of parking, open space, and other accessories. To calculate the permitted amount of dwellings, one must measure the gross area of the site in acres and tenths of an acre, then subtract the gross area of the public and private streets and public dedicated improvement; the remainder will be the build able area. Then divide the net build able area by the smallest minimum lot size; round this number to the nearest lower number and the figure will be the maximum number of units.

Design features
There are various distinct design features in cluster development notably: the consideration of natural features/topography, smaller lot size, the use of cul-de-sacs, and the use of certain waste/storm water management techniques.

Along with site design, waste/storm water management design features are a principle aspect of cluster development. By the maximizing of over land water flow and the strategic use of landforms and plants to slow, hold, and treat runoff, most stormwater can be handled. As well, there many options to deal with wastewater. Techniques such as community drain fields, irrigation systems, and package plants can dramatically reduce the cost of infrastructure and improve the environment.

References

 Whyte, William. Cluster Development 1964
 APA, Smart Growth Code 2.0

See also

 Planned Unit Development
 Environmental Planning
 New Urbanism

Urban planning